United Nations Security Council resolution 1603, adopted unanimously on 3 June 2005, after recalling previous resolutions on the situation in Côte d'Ivoire (Ivory Coast), the council extended the mandate of the United Nations Operation in Côte d'Ivoire (UNOCI) until 24 June 2005.

Resolution

Observations
The security council reaffirmed its support for the Linas-Marcoussis Agreement and its full implementation. It commended the African Union, Economic Community of West African States (ECOWAS) and French forces for their efforts to promote a peaceful settlement in Côte d'Ivoire, but noted existing challenges to the stability of the country and its threat to international peace and security in the region.

There was concern that some peacekeeping troops deployed in African countries had engaged in misconduct.

Acts
Acting under Chapter VII of the United Nations Charter, the council demanded that all signatories to the Pretoria Agreement implement it fully, threatening sanctions against those who did not comply as described in Resolution 1572 (2004). The role of former South African President Thabo Mbeki in the mediation efforts was praised.

The council was satisfied that the Ivorian parties had agreed to hold presidential elections in October 2005 and demanded that the elections should be free, fair and transparent. The Secretary-General Kofi Annan was asked to appoint a special representative to monitor the conduct of these elections.

The resolution also extended the mandate of UNOCI and supporting French forces until 24 June 2005, and for the secretary-general to make arrangements for an increase in the strength of UNOCI. Finally, the secretary-general, African Union and France were asked to keep the council updated on the situation in Côte d'Ivoire.

See also
 Ivorian Civil War
 List of United Nations Security Council Resolutions 1601 to 1700 (2005–2006)
 United Nations Operation in Côte d'Ivoire

References

External links
 
Text of the Resolution at undocs.org

 1603
 1603
2005 in Ivory Coast
May 2005 events